Franklin Township is a civil township of Houghton County in the U.S. state of Michigan.  The population was 1,320 at the 2000 census.

Communities
Backstreet is an unincorporated community in the township, north of Hancock and on the west side of US Highway 41 (US 41).
Frenchtown is an unincorporated community in the township northeast of Hancock on the west side of US Highway 41.
Oneco is an unincorporated community in the township containing Houghton County Memorial Airport.
Ripley is an unincorporated community in the township, just east of Hancock on M-26.
The failed Arcadian mine was located a short distance east of here.

Geography

Demographics
As of the census of 2000, there were 1,320 people, 500 households, and 345 families residing in the township. The racial makeup of the township was 98.79% White, 0.23% African American, 0.23% Native American, 0.15% Asian, and 0.61% from two or more races. Hispanic or Latino of any race were 0.98% of the population. 52.7% were of Finnish, 11.7% German, 6.3% Italian, 5.6% English and 5.0% French ancestry according to Census 2000.

There were 500 households, out of which 31.4% had children under the age of 18 living with them, 57.2% were married couples living together, 6.6% had a female householder with no husband present, and 31.0% were non-families. 26.4% of all households were made up of individuals, and 9.4% had someone living alone who was 65 years of age or older.  The average household size was 2.59 and the average family size was 3.19.

In the township the population was spread out, with 27.2% under the age of 18, 9.0% from 18 to 24, 25.2% from 25 to 44, 25.4% from 45 to 64, and 13.3% who were 65 years of age or older.  The median age was 37 years. For every 100 females, there were 118.9 males.  For every 100 females age 18 and over, there were 113.1 males.

The median income for a household in the township was $31,176, and the median income for a family was $36,250. Males had a median income of $28,438 versus $21,786 for females. The per capita income for the township was $14,866.  About 7.7% of families and 11.6% of the population were below the poverty line, including 14.9% of those under age 18 and 12.0% of those age 65 or over.

References

External links 
Photograph of Norwegian Sunday School classes, Frenchtown from Michigan Technological University Archives
Plan for mining company houses, including type to be built in Frenchtown, from Michigan Technological University Archives
Quincy Mining Company Frenchtown, from Michigan Technological University Archives

Townships in Houghton County, Michigan
Houghton micropolitan area, Michigan
Townships in Michigan